"Drinkin' Me Lonely" is the debut single by American country music artist Chris Young. It was released following his winning season 4 of Nashville Star. Young wrote the song with Larry Wayne Clark.

Content
The song is a ballad about drinking alcohol at a bar to cope with the heartache of losing a girlfriend/wife.

Critical reception
In his review of the album, Thom Jurek of Allmusic gave the song a positive review, saying that "By the time "Drinkin' Me Lonely'" comes up on the player, the album is in full swing. It's a song Merle Haggard would have been proud to write."

Music video
The music video was directed by Warren P. Sonada and premiered in 2006.

Chart performance

References

2006 songs
2006 debut singles
Country ballads
2000s ballads
Chris Young (musician) songs
RCA Records Nashville singles
Songs written by Chris Young (musician)
Song recordings produced by Buddy Cannon